Raitaro is a god of thunder in Japanese mythology. According to Japanese mythological traditions, the deity is also the son of Raijin. The tradition states that, when Raitaro was young, he was found by a farmer named Bimbo.

References 

Japanese religious terminology
Japanese mythology
Thunder gods